Carroll Township is an inactive township in Platte County, in the U.S. state of Missouri.

Carroll Township was erected in 1839.

References

Townships in Missouri
Townships in Platte County, Missouri